Bengal Chatkal Mazdoor Federation is a trade union of jute mill workers in West Bengal, India. The union is affiliated to the All India Central Council of Trade Unions.

References 

Trade unions in India
All India Central Council of Trade Unions
Trade unions of the West Bengal jute mills
Jute industry trade unions
Organizations with year of establishment missing